Timmonds is a surname, and may refer to:

Henry Carroll Timmonds (1853–1913), Missouri politician and judge
Mary Fletcher Timmonds mother of Dixie Cornell Gebhardt
Audrey Timmonds character in Godzilla, most famously played by Maria Pitillo.

See also
Timmins
Timmons